Anthony Genaro Acosta (October 15, 1941 – May 7, 2014) was an American film, television and stage actor.  He was perhaps best known to audiences for his role as Miguel in the 1990 film, Tremors.

Genaro was born in Gallup, New Mexico. He enlisted in the United States Army at the age of 14 by lying about his age. He joined the San Diego Theater Company after leaving the Army, often appearing on stage opposite actor Carl Weathers. He died at his home in Hollywood, California on May 7, 2014, aged 72.

Filmography

References

External links

2014 deaths
American male film actors
American male stage actors
American male television actors
People from Gallup, New Mexico
1942 births